Hakea rigida is a flowering plant in the family Proteaceae with a restricted distribution and endemic to the western Goldfields region of Western Australia. It is a dense shrub with grey bark and sprays of pink flowers in spring.

Description
The small branches are densely matted with silky hairs at flowering. The leaves have 5-9 longitudinal veins, sparsely covered in silky hairs and often twisted where they join the branch. The flat leaves are thick and concave with 5 prominent longitudinal veins. The dark or pale pink racemes of  18-20 scented flowers are borne in leaf axils on smooth short pink stalks.
The surface is mostly smooth with occasional small blister-like protuberances, ending with a small thin beak.

Taxonomy and naming
Hakea rigida was first formally described in 1999 by Laurence Haegi and the description was published in Flora of Australia. Haegi kept the name that Charles Austin Gardner had used to label specimens stored in the Western Australian Herbarium. The specific epithet (rigidus) is believed to be from the Latin rigidus meaning "rigid" referring to the leaves.

Distribution and habitat
Hakea rigida is an uncommon species growing from Beacon, Bonnie Rock, Westonia the Yilgarn north of Southern Cross. Recorded only from a few specimens, occurring in mallee-shrubland, open sand plains to gravelly soils.

Conservation status
Hakea rigida is classified as "Priority Two" by the Government of Western Australia Department of Parks and Wildlife, meaning that it is rare or threatened due to it being known from one to five populations.

References

rigida
Eudicots of Western Australia